The Ixodidae are the family of hard ticks or scale ticks, one of the three families of ticks, consisting of over 700 species. They are known as 'hard ticks' because they have a scutum or hard shield, which the other major family of ticks, the 'soft ticks' (Argasidae), lack. They are ectoparasites of a wide range of host species, and some are vectors of pathogens that can cause human disease.

Description
They are distinguished from the Argasidae by the presence of a scutum. In both the nymph and the adult, a prominent gnathosoma (or capitulum, mouth and feeding parts) projects forward from the animal's body; in the Argasidae, conversely, the gnathosoma is concealed beneath the body.

They differ, too, in their lifecycle; Ixodidae that attach to a host bite painlessly and are generally unnoticed, and they remain in place until they engorge and are ready to change their skin; this process may take days or weeks. Some species drop off the host to moult in a safe place, whereas others remain on the same host and only drop off once they are ready to lay their eggs.

Classification

There are 702 species in 17 genera. The family contains these genera:

 Africaniella – two species
 Amblyomma – 130 species (includes some of Aponomma)
 Anomalohimalaya – three species
 Archaeocroton – one species
 Bothriocroton – seven species
 Cosmiomma – one species
 Cornupalpatum – one species
 Compluriscutula – one species
 Dermacentor – 34 species (includes Anocentor)
 Haemaphysalis – 166 species
 Hyalomma – 27 species
 Ixodes – 246 species
 Margaropus – three species
 Nosomma – two species
 Rhipicentor – two species
 Rhipicephalus – 82 species (includes Boophilus)
 Robertsicus – one species

Fossil genera 
 †Compluriscutula Poinar and Buckley 2008 Burmese amber, Myanmar, Cenomanian
 †Cornupalpatum Poinar and Brown 2003 Burmese amber, Myanmar, Cenomanian

Medical importance

Many hard ticks are of considerable medical importance, acting as vectors of diseases caused by bacteria, protozoa, and viruses, such as Rickettsia and Borrelia. The saliva of female ticks is toxic, causing ascending paralysis in animals and people, known as tick paralysis. Tick species that are commonly associated with tick paralysis are Dermacentor andersoni, Dermacentor occidentalis, Dermacentor variabilis, and Ixodes holocyclus.

Other tick-borne diseases include Lyme disease, babesiosis, ehrlichiosis, Rocky Mountain spotted fever, anaplasmosis, Southern tick-associated rash illness, tick-borne relapsing fever, tularemia, Colorado tick fever, Powassan encephalitis, and Q fever.

See also

 Ticks of domestic animals

References

External links
 
 

 
Ticks
Acari families
Taxa named by Carl Ludwig Koch